Tracy Eyrl-Shortland (née Eyrl) was a New Zealand netball player who played 58 matches for the New Zealand national netball team, known as the Silver Ferns.

Career
In 1980, while playing at for Eastern Netball Club at the Howick Pakuranga Netball Centre, in Pakuranga, Auckland, Eyrl-Shortland was selected for the Auckland Under-16 team. She then moved to the Shore Rovers Netball Club. Eyrl-Shortland first played for the Silver Ferns in 1986. She was a member of the team in 1987 when New Zealand won the gold medal at the 1987 Netball World Championships. She was one of four members of that team who were selected to defend the title in 1991 Netball World Championships, when New Zealand won the silver medal, losing 53–52 to Australia in the final. She also competed in the 1989 World Games winning a silver medal. After retiring from playing, she coached netball with the Eastern Netball club. In 2011 she was nominated as a "Legend of Harbour Sport".

References

Living people
New Zealand netball players
New Zealand international netball players
1991 World Netball Championships players
1987 World Netball Championships players
Netball players at the 1989 World Games
Date of birth missing (living people)
Year of birth missing (living people)
1995 World Netball Championships players